The 2013–14 Celta de Vigo season was the club's 90th season in its history and the 48th in the top-tier.

Squad
As June, 2014..

Squad and statistics

|}

Transfers

Competitions

Overall

La Liga

Copa del Rey

Round of 32

References

RC Celta de Vigo seasons
Celta